The 2016 Taiwanese legislative election was held, along with the presidential election, on 16 January 2016 for all 113 seats in the Legislative Yuan. The Democratic Progressive Party (DPP) led by Tsai Ing-wen, who also won the presidential election on the same day, secured a majority for the first time in history by winning 68 seats. The ruling Kuomintang (KMT) lost both the presidency and its legislative majority and returned to the opposition.

The DPP managed to unseat the KMT in its traditional blue strongholds across Taiwan, turning districts in Taipei, Taichung and Hualien green, while KMT Vice Chairman Hau Lung-bin conceded defeat to relatively unknown city councilor Tsai Shih-ying from the DPP, becoming one of the most notable upsets in the election. The year-old New Power Party (NPP), founded by young activists in the wake of the 2014 Sunflower Movement, entered the Legislative Yuan, winning five seats from KMT veterans.

Electoral system

Members were elected by parallel voting.

Contesting parties and candidates
The two major parties, the Kuomintang and the Democratic Progressive Party, used different strategies when nominating candidates for the Legislative Yuan elections. The Kuomintang nominated a candidate in all but one of the constituency seats. The sole exception was Taipei 2, where they instead supported the New Party candidate. The DPP, on the other hand, developed a cooperation strategy with several minor parties. The DPP agreed to support candidates from these parties in exchange for agreements not to stand in tight races where they might sap DPP votes. These included the New Power Party, the Taiwan Solidarity Union, and the Green-Social Democratic Coalition, as well as several independents. This strategy did not work in Hsinchu, where the NPP and DPP backed separate candidates. A total of 43 female candidates won election to the Legislative Yuan, the most ever to take office.

Opinion polls

Single and multi member districts

Proportional representation

Results

By constituency

Source: Central Election Commission

Results by party-list

Aftermath
Kuomintang Vice Chairman Hau Lung-bin announced he was stepping down after his surprising defeat in the Keelung City Constituency by relatively unknown city councillor Tsai Shih-ying from the DPP, following the Party Chairman Eric Chu resigned from the leadership after his defeat in the presidential election.

By-elections

A total of five legislative seats are scheduled to be contested in by-elections, as both the Kuomintang and Democratic Progressive Party drew candidates for local office from sitting legislators during the 2018 local elections. The first two by-elections are scheduled for 26 January 2019.

See also

2016 Kuomintang chairmanship election
2017 Kuomintang chairmanship election

Notes

References

External links

Government websites
Central Election Commission
Central Election Commission - Election Results

Taiwan
legislative election
Legislative elections in Taiwan
January 2016 events in Asia